Headline Harry and the Great Paper Race is an educational video game by Davidson & Associates based on newsroom journalism. The game has a "find-the-clue" format in the vein of titles like Where in the World is Carmen Sandiego.

Reception 
Caitlin Ackelson reviewed the game for Computer Gaming World, and stated that "Headline Harry is a newsworthy "scoop" in educational software. Funny and compelling, it gives kids a reporter's-eye view of U.S. history. With its treasure-hunt approach to learning and adventure game format, the game provides an entertaining approach to U.S. political and cultural history and the fast-paced, superglamorous world of journalism."

The Los Angeles Times described it as "Carmen San Diego Meets the Front Page". Compute! felt the game was "Complex, but not frustrating".

References

External links 
 NY Times article
Review in Compute!

Educational video games
DOS games
Macintosh games
Davidson & Associates games